Moneulia monilia is a species of moth of the family Tortricidae. It is found in Ecuador (Loja Province).

The ground colour of the forewings is glossy white, strigulated with light grey-brown in the dorsal third of the wing and suffused with the same colour in the distal third. The markings are black-grey with black spots. The hindwings are whitish, tinged with light brownish terminally.

References

External links

Moths described in 2002
Endemic fauna of Ecuador
Euliini
Moths of South America
Taxa named by Józef Razowski